Primera División de Republica Dominicana was the former top division of the Federación Dominicana de Fútbol. Established in 1970, since 2002 this competition serves as second level to the Liga Mayor (see below). The 2005 edition also was played without clubs from the 2004–05 Liga Mayor - apart from the relegated teams Jarabacoa and Santo Domingo Savio (La Vega). In 2015 the league was replaced by Liga Dominicana de Fútbol, the first professional football league in Dominican Republic.

2012-13 standings
 1.Moca FC                                          14  11  2  1  35- 5  35  Champions
 2.Universidad O&M FC                               14   9  3  2  29- 7  30
 3.Bauger FC                                        14   8  3  3  27-14  27
 4.Club Deportivo Pantoja                           14   6  4  4  27-15  22
 5.San Cristóbal FC                                 14   5  4  5  23-21  19
 6.Bayaguana FC                                     14   4  2  8  15-35  14
 7.Club Barcelona Atlético (Sporting Santo Domingo) 14   2  1 11  17-38   7
 8.Jarabacoa FC                                     14   1  1 12  12-50   4

Liga Mayor - 2016 Teams
Atlántico FC (Puerto Plata)
Atlético San Cristóbal (San Cristóbal)
Atlético Vega Real (La Vega)
Bauger FC (Santo Domingo)
Cibao FC (Santiago de los Caballeros)
Club Atlético Pantoja (Santo Domingo)
Club Barcelona Atlético (Santo Domingo)
Delfines del Este FC (La Romana)
Moca FC (Moca)
O&M FC (Santo Domingo)

Previous winners

Primera División

1970 : España FC (Santo Domingo)
1971 : España FC (Santo Domingo)
1972 : UCMM (Santiago de los Caballeros)
1973 : UCMM (Santiago de los Caballeros)
1974 : UCMM (Santiago de los Caballeros)
1975 : Unknown
1976 : Don Bosco (Moca)
1977 : Don Bosco (Moca)
1978 : Don Bosco (Moca)
1979 : Unknown
1980 : Unknown
1981 : Universidad Autónoma (Santo Domingo)

1982 : Unknown
1983 : Unknown
1984 : Unknown
1985 : Don Bosco (Moca)
1986 : Don Bosco (Moca)
1987 : Don Bosco (Moca)
1988–89 : Universidad Autónoma (Santo Domingo)
1989–90 : Universidad Autónoma (Santo Domingo)
1991 : Bancredicard (San Cristóbal)
1992 : Bancredicard (San Cristóbal)
1993 : San Cristóbal FC
1994 : Bancredicard (San Cristóbal)

1995 : Don Bosco (Moca)
1997 : Domingo Savio (La Vega)
1998 : FC Santos (San Cristóbal)
1999 : Don Bosco (Moca)
2000–01 : CD Pantoja
2001–02 : Unknown
2002–03 : CD Pantoja (or Domingo Savio (La Vega))
2003–04 : Casa de España
2005 : Jarabacoa
2006 : Domingo Savio (La Vega)

Liga Mayor
2001–02 : Baninter (Jarabacoa)
2002–03 : Baninter (Jarabacoa)
2004–05 : CD Pantoja
2007 : Club Barcelona Atlético (Santo Domingo)
2009 : CD Pantoja
2010 : Moca FC
2011–12 : CD Pantoja
2012–13 : Moca FC
2014 : Moca FC

Best scorers

References

External links
Official Website
Dominican Republic - List of Champions, RSSSF.com

Football competitions in the Dominican Republic
Dom
1970 establishments in the Dominican Republic
Sports leagues established in 1970
2015 disestablishments in the Dominican Republic
Sports leagues disestablished in 2015